A heptagonal triangle is an obtuse scalene triangle whose vertices coincide with the first, second, and fourth vertices of a regular heptagon (from an arbitrary starting vertex). Thus its sides coincide with one side and the adjacent shorter and longer diagonals of the regular heptagon. All heptagonal triangles are similar (have the same shape), and so they are collectively known as the heptagonal triangle. The heptagonal triangle has various remarkable properties.

Key points

The heptagonal triangle's nine-point center is also its first Brocard point.

The second Brocard point lies on the nine-point circle.

The circumcenter and the Fermat points of a heptagonal triangle form an equilateral triangle.

The distance between the circumcenter O and the orthocenter H  is given by

where R is the circumradius. The squared distance from the incenter I to the orthocenter is

where r is the inradius.

The two tangents from the orthocenter to the circumcircle are mutually perpendicular.

Relations of distances

Sides

The heptagonal triangle's sides a < b < c coincide respectively with the regular heptagon's side, shorter diagonal, and longer diagonal. They satisfy

(the latter being the optic equation) and hence

and

Thus –b/c, c/a, and a/b all satisfy the cubic equation

However, no algebraic expressions with purely real terms exist for the solutions of this equation, because it is an example of casus irreducibilis.

The approximate relation of the sides is

We also have

 
satisfy the cubic equation

We also have
 
satisfy the cubic equation

We also have
 
satisfy the cubic equation

We also have

and

We also have
  
  
  

There are no other (m, n), m, n > 0, m, n < 2000 such that

Altitudes

The altitudes ha, hb, and hc satisfy

and

The altitude from side b (opposite angle B)  is half the internal angle bisector  of A:

Here angle A is the smallest angle, and B is the second smallest.

Internal angle bisectors

Circumradius, inradius, and exradius

The triangle's area is

where R is the triangle's circumradius.

We have

We also have

The ratio r /R of the inradius to the circumradius is the positive solution of the cubic equation

In addition,

We also have

In general for all integer n, 

where 

and 

We also have

We also have
  
  

The exradius ra corresponding to side a equals the radius of the nine-point circle of the heptagonal triangle.

Orthic triangle

The heptagonal triangle's  orthic triangle, with vertices at the feet of the altitudes, is similar to the heptagonal triangle, with similarity ratio 1:2. The heptagonal triangle is the only obtuse triangle that is similar to its orthic triangle (the equilateral triangle being the only acute one).

Trigonometric properties

The various trigonometric identities associated with the heptagonal triangle include these:

The cubic equation

The positive solution of the cubic equation

equals  which is twice the cosine of one of the triangle’s angles.

Sin (2π / 7), sin (4π / 7), and sin (8π / 7) are the roots of
  

  
We also have:
   
  

For an integer   n , let      

For n = 0,...,20,       
      

     
For    n= 0, -1, ,..-20,       
   

For an integer   n , let      

For    n= 0, 1, ,..10,   
 

For an integer   n , let      

For    n= 0, 1, ,..10,   

We also have 

    

We also have   

We also have   
 

 
 
 
 
 
 
 

We also have

We also have Ramanujan type identities,

We also have

References

Types of triangles